This is a list of all the United States Supreme Court cases from volume 513 of the United States Reports:

External links

1994 in United States case law
1995 in United States case law